The 1977 Bolivian Primera División, the first division of Bolivian football (soccer), was played by 16 teams. The champion was The Strongest.

First stage

Serie A

Serie B

Second stage

Serie A

Liguilla

Serie B

Final Group

Title play-off

External links
 Official website of the LFPB 

Bolivian Primera División seasons
Bolivia
1977 in Bolivian sport